Paolo Mosetti (29 January 1939 – 17 February 2009) was an Italian Olympic rower.

References

External links
 

1939 births
2009 deaths
Italian male rowers
Rowers at the 1960 Summer Olympics
Olympic rowers of Italy
Sportspeople from Trieste
European Rowing Championships medalists
Mediterranean Games gold medalists for Italy
Mediterranean Games medalists in rowing
Competitors at the 1963 Mediterranean Games